Julia Bonk (born 29 April 1986) is a former Left Party politician who served in the Landtag of Saxony from 2004 to 2014. Elected at age 18, she became the youngest member of a parliament in Germany.

Career 
Bonk became a member of the Landtag of Saxony in 2004 immediately after finishing school, later joining the Left Party in 2006. During the fourth legislative period of the Landtag of Saxony (2004–2009), Bonk was the Vice-Spokeswoman of the parliamentary committee on School and Sport and member of the committee on Science and University.

The newspaper Badische Zeitung counted that 87 international papers printed her picture.

References

External links

   (via archive.org)

1986 births
Living people
Libertarian socialists
People from Burg bei Magdeburg
The Left (Germany) politicians
21st-century German politicians
Women members of State Parliaments in Germany
TU Dresden alumni
German socialists
Members of the Landtag of Saxony
21st-century German women politicians